(born 1 October 1941 in Ashikaga, Japan) is a Japanese Brazilian judoka, who won Brazil's first Olympic medal in judo at the 1972 Summer Olympics in Munich, West Germany.

Career
Ishii trained judo since a very young age, at a dojo located near his house, and graduated in pedagogy at Waseda University. He was eager to participate in the first judo Olympic tournamentat the 1964 Summer Olympics in Tokyo, but lost his spot to eventual gold medalist Isao Okano. Frustrated, he quit the sport and decided to emigrate to Brazil, where he would become a farmer. After a sixty-day boat trip, Ishii arrived in Brazil and worked in a farm at a Japanese Brazilian community in Presidente Prudente. After being convinced to fight a local judo tournament for fun, Ishii's skills impressed enough for the inhabitants to ask him to become a judo teacher. Added to Ishii's frustration with the farming life, he started to teach the martial art, eventually opening a dojo in São Paulo. In 1969, Ishii was naturalized Brazilian to take part in judo competitions.

He won a bronze medal at both the 1972 Summer Olympics in Munich, and the 1971 World Judo Championships.

Two of Ishii's three daughters, Tânia and Vânia Ishii, are also judokas.

References

External links
Ishii's dojo 

1941 births
Living people
Olympic judoka of Brazil
Judoka at the 1972 Summer Olympics
Olympic bronze medalists for Brazil
Olympic medalists in judo
Brazilian male judoka
Sportspeople from Tochigi Prefecture
Naturalized citizens of Brazil
Japanese emigrants to Brazil
Medalists at the 1972 Summer Olympics